Mandsaur is a city and a municipality in Mandsaur district located on Border of Mewar and Malwa region of Madhya Pradesh state of central India. It is the administrative headquarters of Mandsaur District. The ancient Pashupatinath Temple is located in Mandsaur.

History

Aulikaras of Dashapura
Epigraphical discoveries have brought to light two ancient royal houses, who call themselves as Aulikaras and ruled from Dashapura (present-day Mandsaur). The first dynasty, who ruled from Dashapura from the beginning comprised the following kings in the order of succession: Jayavarma, Simhavarma, Naravarma, Vishvavarma and Bandhuvarma. The Risthal stone slab inscription discovered in 1983 has brought to light another Aulikara dynasty, which comprised the following kings in the order of succession: Drumavardhana, Jayavardhana Ajitavardhana, Vibhishanavardhana, Rajyavardhana and Prakashadharma. After Parakshadharma, the ruler of Mandsaur was Yashodharma, who is identified with Vishnuvardhana, who erected a pillar of victory at Bayana due to which Bayana's name became Vijaygarh. In all probabilities, he was the son and immediate successor of Prakashadharma.

Yashodharman rule 

Sondani (सोंधनी) is a small village at a distance of about 4 km from Mandsaur situated on Mahu-Nimach Highway towards Mahu. In a part of the inscription Yasodharman praises himself for having defeated king Mihirakula:

Gurjara-Pratihara Dynasty

The Gurjara Pratihara empire was extended up to Mandasor during the reign of Mahendrapala II.

Medieval era 
There are two gardens in which there is a pillar of torandwar. It is believed to be pillar of Surya Mandir of the inscription of Bandhu Varma. There is a Shiva statue also in the garden.

Maratha Empire 
The Battle of Mandsaur took place in Mandsaur, India between the Maratha Army and Jai Singh II of Amber.
In February 1732, the Marathas completely surrounded Jai Singh with their enormous cavalry and started cutting of his supplies. The Jaipur Raja was forced to sue for peace, he offered the Marathas six lakhs, but Holkar refused and demanded more. While the negotiations were taking place, a rumour surfaced about reinforcements from the emperor. This raised the morale of the Jaipur army and the Rajputs got ready for battle, the Marathas quickly attacked the rearguard of the Jaipur army and killed its commander. The Rajputs also attacked and killed fifteen Maratha officers in the fight that followed. Holkar and his men retreated 30 miles away from the battlefield. Jai Singh followed them but was outpaced by the Maratha cavalry who reached Jai Singhs camp and forced him to surrender.
Jai Singh was forced to give six lakhs to Holkar and allow him to collect chauth from 28 pargana's in Malwa.
The Maratha victory at the Battle of Mandsaur had the following consequences:
Scindias and Holkars were emboldened to renew their attack on Rajputana.
Kota and Bundi were made the next targets in the same year by the Marathas.

Princely State 
In 19th century before India's independence in 1947, Mandsaur was part of the princely state of Gwalior. It gave its name to the treaty with the Holkar Maharaja of Indore, who concluded the Third Anglo-Maratha War and the Pindari War in 1818. At the turn of the 20th century it was a centre of the Malwa opium trade.

Mention in Kalidas Manuscript 
Mention of Dashpur can be found in Kalidas poem Meghdoot (Purva-megha) 47th stanza. Kalidas writes about the beauty of the eyes of women from Dashpur in his aesthetic piece of words.

Geography
Mandsaur District forms the northern projection of Madhya Pradesh from its western Division, i.e., Ujjain Commissioner's Division. It lies between the parallels of latitude 230 45' 50" North and 250 2' 55" North, and between the meridians of longitude 740 42' 30" East and 750 50' 20" East.

The District is an average size district of Madhya Pradesh.

Demographics
 India census, Mandsaur had a population of 141,468 male population was  72,370 and female population was 69,098, giving a sex-ration of 898.  Mandsaur had an effective literacy rate of 86.79%, higher than the national average: male literacy was 92.74, and female literacy was 80.60%.  15,721 (11.1%) of the population was under 6 years of age.

Education
The institutes and universities headquartered in Mandsaur include: 
Mandsaur Institute of Technology
Mandsaur University

References

 
Former capital cities in India
Cities in Madhya Pradesh